Leptodactylodon ventrimarmoratus is a species of frog in the family Arthroleptidae.
It is endemic to Cameroon.
Its natural habitats are subtropical or tropical moist lowland forests, subtropical or tropical moist montane forests, rivers, freshwater springs, and rocky areas.
It is threatened by habitat loss.

References

Leptodactylodon
Endemic fauna of Cameroon
Taxonomy articles created by Polbot
Amphibians described in 1904